The Battle of Rasil was fought between the Rashidun Caliphate and the Rai kingdom ruled by Raja Rasil in early 644. It was the first encounter of the Rashidun Caliphate in the Indian subcontinent. The exact location of the battle is not known, but historians suggest it was fought on the western bank of the River Indus.

Suhail ibn Adi was given command of this expedition by Caliph Umar. Suhail marched from Busra in 643. He eventually reached Makran, what is now a part of present-day Pakistan. It was a traditional territory of Sassanids for centuries but was then a domain of the Rai Kingdom, who annexed it in 636-637 although they acted as a vassal of Sassanid Persians in past.

Background

Before the Muslim raids, Makran was under the Hindu Rais of Sindh, but the region was also shared by the Zunbils. From an early period, parts of it frequently alternated between Indian and Persian control with the Persian portion in the west and the Indian portion in the east. It was later annexed by the Persians from Rai Sahiras II. It was reconquered by the usurper Chach of Alor in 631. Ten years later, it was described to be "under the government of Persia" by Xuanzang who visited the region. Three years later however, when the Arabs invaded, it was regarded as the "frontier of Al-Hind".

Battle 

Raja Rasil, a local Hindu potentate of the Kingdom of Sindh, concentrated huge armies in Makran to halt the advance of the Muslims. Suhail was reinforced by Uthman ibn Abi al-'As from Persepolis, and Hakam ibn Amr from Busra. The combined forces defeated Raja Rasil at the Battle of Rasil, who retreated to the eastern bank of River Indus. The Raja’s army had included war elephants, but these had posed little problem for the Muslim army, who had dealt with them during the conquest of Persia. In accordance with the orders of Caliph Umar, the captured war elephants were sold in Islamic Persia, with the proceeds distributed among the soldiers as share in booty. 

Further east from the Indus River laid Sindh, which was the domain of the Rai Kingdom. Umar, after learning that Sindh was a poor and relatively barren land, disapproved Suhail's proposal to cross the Indus River. For the time being, Umar declared the Indus River, a natural barrier, to be the easternmost frontier of his domain. This campaign came to an end in mid-644.

Aftermath
This was the first confrontation between the Rashidun Caliphate and a Hindu kingdom of Sindh. The victorious Arab army returned to Persia along with booty and a war elephant. In accordance with the orders of Umar, the captured war elephants were sold in Islamic Persia, with the proceeds distributed among the soldiers as share in booty. 

In response to Caliph Umar’s question about the land of Makran beyond the Indus River, the messenger replied:

Umar looked at the messenger and said: 
"Are you a messenger or a poet? He replied “Messenger”.

Thereupon Caliph Umar, after learning that Baluchistan was a barren land and unfavorable for sending an army, instructed Hakim bin Amr al Taghlibi that for the time being Makran should be the easternmost frontier of the Rashidun Caliphate, and that no further attempt should be made to extend the conquests. This was mainly because of Umar's policy of consolidating the rule before conquering more land. The same year, in 644, Umar had already rejected the proposal by Ahnaf ibn Qais, conqueror of Khurasan, of crossing Oxus river in the north to invade Central Asia. In the west he similarly had called back 'Amr ibn al-'As who had marched to North Africa and had captured Tripoli.

See also 
Muslim conquests
Muslim conquests on the Indian subcontinent

Notes 

Battles involving the Rashidun Caliphate
Military history of Pakistan
History of Sindh
644